The Northeast Amateur is an amateur golf tournament played annually at the Wannamoisett Country Club in Rumford, Rhode Island. It was first played in 1962.

In December 2021, the Northeast Amateur joined with six other tournaments to form the Elite Amateur Golf Series.

Winners

2022 Dylan Menante
2021 Dylan Menante
2020 Canceled
2019 Garrett May
2018 Justin Suh
2017 Collin Morikawa
2016 Fred Wedel
2015 Hunter Stewart
2014 Stewart Jolly
2013 Cory Whitsett
2012 Shin Yong-gu
2011 Peter Uihlein
2010 Joseph Bramlett
2009 Dan Woltman
2008 Brendan Gielow
2007 Dustin Johnson
2006 Carlton Forrester
2005 Kyle Reifers
2004 Anthony Kim
2003 Chris Nallen
2002 Brian Quackenbush
2001 Luke Donald
2000 Luke Donald
1999 Jonathan Byrd
1998 Michael Harris
1997 Brad Elder
1996 Jason Enloe
1995 Notah Begay III
1994 Gary Simpson
1993 Allen Doyle
1992 David Duval
1991 Jay Sigel
1990 Todd White
1989 Jeff Barlow
1988 Brett Quigley
1987 Bob Lewis
1986 Bob Friend
1985 Jay Sigel
1984 Jay Sigel
1983 Bill Hadden
1982 Chris Perry
1981 Dick von Tacky
1980 Hal Sutton
1979 John Cook
1978 John Cook
1977 Scott Hoch
1976 Bob Byman
1975 Rocky Waitt
1974 Bill Hyndman
1973 Ben Crenshaw
1972 Wally Kuchar
1971 Vinny Giles
1970 Allen Miller
1969 Jerry Courville
1968 Pete Bostwick, Jr.
1967 Marty Fleckman
1966 Dick Siderowf
1965 Ronnie Quinn
1964 Ronnie Quinn
1963 Gene Francis
1962 Dick Siderowf

References

External links
Official site
List of winners

Amateur golf tournaments in the United States
Golf in Rhode Island